The Lebanese people ( / ALA-LC:) are the people inhabiting or originating from Lebanon. The term may also include those who had inhabited Mount Lebanon and the Anti-Lebanon Mountains prior to the creation of the modern Lebanese state. The major religious groups among the Lebanese people within Lebanon are Shia Muslims (27%), Sunni Muslims (27%), Maronite Christians (21%), Greek Orthodox Christians (8%), Melkite Christians (5%), Druze (5.2%), Protestant Christians (1%). The largest contingent of Lebanese, however, comprise a diaspora in North America, South America, Europe, Australia and Africa, which is predominantly Maronite Christian.

As the relative proportion of the various sects is politically sensitive, Lebanon has not collected official census data on ethnic background since 1932 under the French Mandate. It is therefore difficult to have an exact demographic analysis of Lebanese society.
The largest concentration of people of Lebanese ancestry may be in Brazil having an estimated population of 5.8 to 7 million, but it may be an exaggeration, given that an official survey conducted by the Brazilian Institute of Geography and Statistics (IBGE) showed that less than 1 million Brazilians claimed any Middle-Eastern origin. The Lebanese have always traveled the world, many of them settling permanently, most notably in the last two centuries.

Estimated to have lost their status as the majority in Lebanon itself, with their reduction in numbers largely as a result of their emigration, Christians still remain one of the principal religious groups in the country. Descendants of Lebanese Christians make up the majority of Lebanese people worldwide, appearing principally in the diaspora.

Identity

Immediately prior to the introduction of Arabic, the people residing in Lebanon—both those who would become Muslim and the vast majority who would remain Christian, along with the tiny Jewish minority—spoke Aramaic, or more precisely, a Western Aramaic language. However, since at least the 15th century, the majority of people of all faiths living in what is now Lebanon have been Arabic-speaking, or more specifically, speakers of Lebanese Arabic, although as late as the 17th century, travellers in Lebanon still reported on several Aramaic-speaking villages where the language was the community's vernacular and not merely liturgical.

Among Lebanese Maronites, Aramaic still remains the liturgical language of the Maronite Church, although in an Eastern Aramaic form (the Syriac language, in which early Christianity was disseminated throughout the Middle East), distinct from the spoken Aramaic of Lebanon, which was a Western Aramaic language. As the second of two liturgical languages of Judaism, Aramaic was also retained as a language in the sphere of religion (in the Talmud) among Lebanese Jews, although here too in an Eastern Aramaic form (the Talmud was composed in Babylonia in Babylonian Aramaic). Among Lebanese Muslims, however, Aramaic was lost twice, once in the shift to Arabic in the vernacular (Lebanese Arabic) and again in the religious sphere, since Arabic (Qur'anic Arabic) is the liturgical language of Islam.

Some Lebanese Christians, particularly Maronites, identify themselves as Lebanese rather than Arab, seeking to draw "on the Phoenician past to try to forge an identity separate from the prevailing Arab culture". They argue that Arabization merely represented a shift to the Arabic language as the vernacular of the Lebanese people, and that, according to them, no actual shift of ethnic identity, much less ancestral origins, occurred. Certain portions of Lebanon's Christian population in particular tend to stress aspects of Lebanon's non-Arab prior history to encompass all of Lebanon's historical stages, instead of considering the beginning of Lebanese history being with the Arab conquests.

In light of this "old controversy about identity", some Lebanese prefer to see Lebanon, Lebanese culture and themselves as part of "Mediterranean" and "Levantine" civilization, in a concession to their various layers of heritage.

Population numbers

The total Lebanese population is estimated at 8 to 18 million. Of these, the vast majority, or 4- 14 million, constitute part of the Lebanese diaspora (residing outside of Lebanon), with approximately 4.7 million citizens residing in Lebanon itself.

Lebanon

There are approximately 4.7 million Lebanese citizens in Lebanon.

In addition to this figure, there are an additional 1 million foreign workers (mainly Syrians), and about 470,000 Palestinian refugees in the nation.

Lebanon is also a home to various ethnic minorities found refuge in the country over the centuries. Prominent ethnic minorities in the country include the Armenians, the Kurds, the Turks, the Assyrians, the Iranians and some European ethnicities (Greeks, Italians, French).

There are also a small number of nomadic Dom Gypsies (part of the Roma people of South Asian, particularly, Indian descent)

Diaspora

The Lebanese diaspora consists of approximately 4- 14 million, both Lebanese-born living abroad and those born-abroad of Lebanese descent. The majority of the Lebanese in the diaspora are Christians, disproportionately so in the Americas where the vast majority reside. An estimate figure show that they represent about 75% of the Lebanese in total. Lebanese abroad are considered "rich, educated and influential" and over the course of time immigration has yielded Lebanese "commercial networks" throughout the world.

The largest number of Lebanese is to be found in Brazil, where according to the Brazilian and Lebanese governments claim, there are 7 million Brazilians of Lebanese descent. These figures, however, may be an exaggeration given that, according to a 2008 survey conducted by IBGE, in 2008, covering only the states of Amazonas, Paraíba, São Paulo, Rio Grande do Sul, Mato Grosso and Distrito Federal, 0.9% of white Brazilian respondents said they had family origins in the Middle East

Large numbers also reside elsewhere in North America, most notably in the United States (489,702) and in Canada, the people of full or partial Lebanese descent are between 190,275 (by ancestry, 2011 Census) to 250,000 based on estimates. In the rest of the Americas, significant communities are found in Argentina, Mexico (400,000); Chile, Colombia and Venezuela, with almost every other Latin American country having at least a small presence.

In Africa, Ghana and the Ivory Coast are home to over 100,000 Lebanese. There are significant Lebanese populations in other countries throughout Western and Central Africa. Australia hosts over 180,000 and Canada 250,000. In the Arab world, around 400,000 Lebanese live in the Arab states of the Persian Gulf. More than 2,500 ex-SLA members remain in Israel.

Currently, Lebanon provides no automatic right to Lebanese citizenship for emigrants who lost their citizenship upon acquiring the citizenship of their host country, nor for the descendants of emigrants born abroad. This situation disproportionately affects Christians. Recently, the Maronite Institution of Emigrants called for the establishment of an avenue by which emigrants who lost their citizenship may regain it, or their overseas-born descendants (if they so wish) may acquire it.

The list below contains approximate figures for people of Lebanese descent by country of residence, largely taken from the iLoubnan diaspora map. Additional reliable cites have been provided where possible. Additional estimates have been included where they can be cited; where applicable, these are used in place of the iLoubnan figures. The Figure below uses the data from the list and calculates the amount of Lebanese residents as a percentage of the total population of the respective country.

Note: An important percentage of Arabs in Argentina, Chile, Brazil, Colombia, Mexico, Venezuela, Bulgaria, Romania, Italy, Portugal and Spain are of Lebanese ancestry. They are denoted ** for this purpose.

Religion

Lebanon has several different main religions. The country has the most religiously diverse society in the Middle East, encompassing 17 recognized religious sects. The main two religions among the Lebanese people are Christianity (the Maronite Church, the Greek Orthodox Church, the Melkite, the Protestant Church) and Islam (Shia and Sunni). The third-largest religion is Druze.

There are other non-Lebanese Christian minorities such as Armenians (Armenian Apostolic Church and Armenian Catholic Church), French-Italians (Latin Catholic Lebanese), Assyrians (Assyrian Church of the East, Syriac Catholic Church, Syriac Orthodox Church, Chaldean Catholic Church) and Copts (Coptic Orthodox Church of Alexandria), who immigrated to Lebanon over the years.

No official census has been taken since 1932, reflecting the political sensitivity in Lebanon over confessional (i.e. religious) balance.

A study conducted by Statistics Lebanon, a Beirut-based research firm, cited by the United States Department of State found that of Lebanon's population of approximately 4.3 million is estimated to be:

 54% Islam (Shia and Sunni, 27% each)
 40.5% Christian (21% Maronite, 8% Greek Orthodox, 5% Melkite Catholics, 1% Protestant, 5.5% other minority Christian denominations like Latin Catholics, Armenian Orthodox, Armenian Catholic, Syriac Catholic, Syriac Orthodox, Chaldean Catholic, Assyrian Catholic and Coptic Orthodox)
 5.5% Druze (a minority religion, descended from Shia Islam, who do not consider themselves to be Muslim, even though under the terms of the Lebanese Constitution the Druze community is designated as a part of the Lebanese Muslim community.)

There are also very small numbers of other religions such as Judaism, Mormons, Baháʼí Faith, and also religions practiced by foreigner workers like Buddhism and Hinduism.

The CIA World Factbook estimates (2020) the following , though this data does not include Lebanon's sizable Syrian and Palestinian refugee populations: Muslim 67.8% (Sunni, Shia and smaller percentages of Alawites and Ismailis), Christian 32.4% (mainly Maronite Catholics are the largest Christian group), Druze 4.5%, and very small numbers of Jews, Baha'is, Buddhists, and Hindus.

The International Foundation for Electoral Systems provides source for the registered voters in Lebanon for 2011 (it has to be noted that voter registration does not include people under 18 and unregistered voters) that puts the numbers as following: 
Sunni Islam 27.65%, Shia Islam 27.34%,
Maronite Catholic 21.05%, Greek Orthodox 7.34%, Druze 5.74%, Melkite Catholic 4.76%, Armenian Apostolic 2.64%, other Christian Minorities 1.28%, Alawite Shia Islam 0.88%, Armenian Catholic 0.62%, Evangelical Protestant 0.53%, and other 0.18% of the population.

With the diaspora included, the Christians are an absolute majority. Lebanon has a population of Mhallamis also known as Mardinli), most of whom migrated from northeast Syria and southeast Turkey are estimated to be between 75,000 and 100,000 and considered to be part of the Sunni population. These have in recent years been granted Lebanese citizenship and, coupled with several civil wars between Islamic extremists and the Lebanese military that have caused many Christians to flee the country, have re-tipped the demographic balance in favour of the Muslims and the Sunnis in particular. In addition, many thousands of Arab Bedouins in the Bekaa and in the Wadi Khaled region, who are entirely Sunnis, were granted Lebanese citizenship. Lebanon also has a Jewish population, estimated at less than 100.

Though Lebanon is a secular country, family matters such as marriage, divorce and inheritance are still handled by the religious authorities representing a person's faith. Calls for civil marriage are unanimously rejected by the religious authorities but civil marriages held in another country are recognized by Lebanese civil authorities.

Legally registered Muslims form around 54% of the population (Shia, Sunni, Alawite). Legally registered Christians form up to 41% (Maronite, Greek Orthodox Christian, Melkite, Armenian, Evangelical, other). Druze form around 5%. A small minority of 0.1% includes Jews, and foreign workers who belong to Hindu and Buddhist religions.

Non-religion is not recognized by the state, however in 2009, the Minister of the Interior Ziad Baroud made it possible to have the religious sect removed from the Lebanese identity card, this does not, however, deny the religious authorities complete control over civil family issues inside the country.

Genetics

Y-DNA haplogroups

Theories from some studies propose to corroborate that the Lebanese trace genetic continuity with earlier inhabitants, regardless of their membership to any of Lebanon's different religious communities today. In a 2007 study, geneticist Pierre Zalloua found that "the genetic marker which identifies descendants of the ancient Phoenicians found among members of all of Lebanon's religious communities." In a 2013 interview Pierre Zalloua, pointed out that genetic variation preceded religious variation and divisions: "Lebanon already had well-differentiated communities with their own genetic peculiarities, but not significant differences, and religions came as layers of paint on top."By identifying the ancient type of DNA attributed to the Phoenicians, geneticist Pierre Zalloua was also able to chart their spread out of the eastern Mediterranean. These markers were found in unusually high proportions in non-Lebanese samples from other parts of the "Mediterranean coast where the Phoenicians are known to have established colonies, such as Carthage in today's Tunisia." The markers were also found among samples of Syrians, Palestinians, Maltese and Spaniards, where the Phoenicians were also known to have established colonies. The study shows that 1 out of 17 people in the countries surrounding the Mediterranean basin can be identified with the Levantine genetic markers in their male chromosomes. However, the particular marker associated by some studies with the historical Phoenicians, haplogroup J2, actually represents a complex mosaic of different demographic processes which affected the Mediterranean in prehistoric and historic times.

In a 2011 genetic study by Haber et al. which analyzed the male-line Y-chromosome genetics of the different religious groups of Lebanon, revealed no large genetic differentiation between the Maronites, Greek Orthodox Christians, Greek Catholic Christians, Sunni Muslims, Shia Muslims, and Druze of the country in regards to the more frequent haplogroups. Major differences between Lebanese groups were found among the less frequent haplogroups.

Autosomal DNA
According to a 2017 study published by the American Journal of Human Genetics, present-day Lebanese derive most of their ancestry from a Canaanite-related population (Canaanite being a pre-Phoenician name), which therefore implies substantial genetic continuity in the Levant since at least the Bronze Age. More specifically, according to geneticist Chris Tyler-Smith and his team at the Sanger Institute in Britain, who compared "sampled ancient DNA from five Canaanite people who lived 3,750 and 3,650 years ago" to modern people, revealed that 93 percent of the genetic ancestry of people in Lebanon came from the Canaanites (the other 7 percent was of a Eurasian steppe population).

A 2019 study, carried out by the Wellcome Sanger Institute, United Kingdom, after analyzing the "DNA evidence from the remains of nine Crusaders found at a burial site in Lebanon", concludes that, contrarily to some idea, the Crusaders didn't leave "a lasting effect on the genetics of modern-day Lebanese. Instead, today’s Lebanese Christians in particular are more genetically similar to locals from the Roman period, which preceded the Crusades by more than four centuries."

In a 2020 study published in the American Journal of Human Genetics, researchers have shown that there is substantial genetic continuity in Lebanon since the Bronze Age interrupted by three significant admixture events during the Iron Age, Hellenistic, and Ottoman period, each contributing 3%–11% of non-local ancestry to the admixed population.

Relationship with other populations
Other studies have sought to establish relationships between Lebanese people and other groups. A 2013 genetic study carried out by Haber at al found that Lebanese Druze and Druze from Mount Carmel cluster together, Lebanese Christians form a private branch with the Christian populations of Armenia and Cyprus, and Lebanese Muslims cluster towards the Muslim populations of Syrians, Palestinians, and Jordanians, which in turn cluster on branches with other Muslim populations as distant as Morocco and Yemen.

One study by the International Institute of Anthropology in Paris, France, confirmed similarities in the Y-haplotype frequencies in Lebanese, Palestinian, and Sephardic Jewish men, identifying them as "three Near-Eastern populations sharing a common geographic origin." The study surveyed one Y-specific DNA polymorphism (p49/Taq I) in 54 Lebanese and 69 Palestinian males, and compared with the results found in 693 Jews from three distinct Jewish ethnic groups; Mizrahi Jews, Sephardi Jews, and Ashkenazi Jews.

Notable individuals

See also
List of Lebanese people
Arab diaspora
Lebanese diaspora 
Lebanese Americans
Lebanese Australians
Lebanese Argentines
Lebanese Brazilians
Lebanese Canadians
Lebanese Colombians
Lebanese Mexicans
Lebanese New Zealanders
Lebanese Jamaicans
Lebanese Haitians
Lebanese Uruguayans
Lebanese Venezuelans
Lebanese Jews
Lebanese people in Ecuador
Lebanese people in France
Lebanese people in the United Kingdom
Lebanese people in Ivory Coast
Lebanese people in South Africa
Lebanese people in Senegal
Lebanese people in Sierra Leone
Lebanese nationality law
Levant
Mediterranean race
Migrant domestic workers in Lebanon

Notes

References

Footnotes

External links
, Hamline University, 2002

 
Arabs
Semitic-speaking peoples
Ethnic groups in the Middle East